Sergeant Major Brendan W. O'Connor (born 1960) is a retired Special Forces medical sergeant in the United States Army. On April 30, 2008, he was awarded the Distinguished Service Cross for his heroic action in Afghanistan. The DSC is the nation's second highest award for valor (after the Medal of Honor) and this was only the second time since the Vietnam War that the medal was awarded.

Early life
Brendan W. O'Connor was born at the United States Military Academy at West Point, New York, the fifth of six children, to LTC Mortimer O'Connor and Elizabeth O'Connor. After his father died in combat in Vietnam, the family settled in Moorestown, New Jersey, where he attended Moorestown High School. Brendan enlisted in the United States Army Reserve (USAR) and enrolled in the Reserve Officers' Training Corps at Valley Forge Military Junior College at Wayne, Pennsylvania, in 1978. He was commissioned in 1980 and served as the executive officer of a Special Forces team, later as a rifle platoon leader and rifle company commander, and then as a team commander.

In 1994, he resigned his commission in the Reserves and enlisted in the Active Army to become a Special Forces medical sergeant. In 2005, he deployed to Afghanistan for Operation Enduring Freedom as a medical sergeant and a team's operations sergeant.

Heroic action
On June 23, 2006, O'Connor and his team were ambushed by over 250 Taliban fighters in southern Afghanistan. During the ensuing 17½ hours of intense combat, two soldiers were seriously wounded. The Afghan translator with the team radioed for permission to kill the two wounded soldiers and himself to prevent the Taliban from capturing, then torturing, mutilating, and executing them.

O'Connor started to crawl out to assist the two wounded soldiers but couldn't get low enough to avoid detection. He then removed his body armor and slowly crawled toward the two soldiers, taking a full 90 minutes to crawl 200 yards, while machine gun bullets passed close enough to cut down the grass around him. Eventually reaching the wounded, O'Connor gave them first aid, then moved them to a more secure position. Afterwards the team sergeant was killed, at which point O'Connor took command of the team.

Covered by a United States Air Force plane, the team was able to withdraw. They suffered two dead and one seriously wounded but had killed over 120 Taliban fighters.

In a ceremony at Fort Bragg, O'Connor was awarded the Distinguished Service Cross while two other soldiers were awarded Silver Stars (one posthumously).

Awards and decorations

Distinguished Service Cross

Commendations

Family
He is married to Margaret Elizabeth (née Garvey); they have three sons and two daughters.

See also

References

1960 births
Living people
People from Moorestown, New Jersey
Recipients of the Distinguished Service Cross (United States)
United States Army non-commissioned officers
Members of the United States Army Special Forces
Moorestown High School alumni
Valley Forge Military Academy and College alumni